Bureau 13 is a graphic adventure game developed by Take-Two Interactive and published by GameTek for MS-DOS compatible operating systems and Microsoft Windows in 1995. It is based on the role-playing game system Bureau 13 and was created by the authors of Hell: A Cyberpunk Thriller. Ports to the Amiga and CD32 were cancelled.

Reception

A reviewer for Next Generation commented that "Although in some ways it's a bit basic compared to its competition, Bureau 13 has enough originality to make it worth a second look." He gave it two out of five stars.

Retrospectively, Richard Cobbett of PC Gamer opined "Bureau 13 is a really dumb game with some clever ideas - one of the kind that doesn't actually work, but really should have," having "the clumsiest interfaces ever inflicted on the world, and one of the dullest worlds."

References

External links
Bureau 13 at MobyGames

1995 video games
Adventure games
Cancelled Amiga games
DOS games
1990s horror video games
Science fantasy video games
Single-player video games
Take-Two Interactive games
Video games about vampires
Video games based on tabletop role-playing games
Video games developed in the United States
Video games featuring female protagonists
Windows games
Video games about witchcraft
GameTek games